The mainly Quaternary Harra of Arhab is the northernmost, historically active volcanic field in Yemen. Also known as the "Sana'a-'Amran volcanic field", or simply the "Sana'a volcanic field", it has erupted in ancient times.


Morphology
The field is located on a 1500 km2 volcanic plateau. The plateau contains a few small (older) stratovolcanoes and 60 volcanic cones. The field is arranged on a north-northwest line. Younger basaltic rocks from the Pliocene-Holocene (northern end of the field), overlie Rhyolitic rocks from the Oligocene-Miocene, which covers most of the field.

Eruptions
A historical eruption in 200 AD (a VEI 2) took place on the flank of an older cinder cone (Jabal Zebib). Another eruption from the volcano in around 500 AD took place on the south flank of Kaulet Hattab cinder cone.

See also
 Global Volcanism Program
 List of volcanoes in Yemen
 Sarat Mountains

References

External links
 

Volcanoes of Yemen
Active volcanoes